Garrison is a census-designated place (CDP) in Baltimore County, Maryland, United States, adjacent to Owings Mills. It consists mainly of the McDonogh area and Valley Centre. The population was 8,823 at the 2010 census.

Geography
Garrison is located at  (39.401055, −76.751073).

Demographics

As of the census of 2000, there were 7,969 people, 3,459 households, and 1,940 families residing in the CDP. The racial makeup of the CDP was 77.54% White, 17.09% African American, 0.13% Native American, 3.35% Asian, 0.01% Pacific Islander, 0.92% from other races, and 0.97% from two or more races. Hispanic or Latino of any race were 2.27% of the population. In 2000, 14% of Garrison residents identified as being of Russian American heritage. This was the second highest percentage of Russian Americans of any place in Maryland after Pikesville. The majority of them are of Jewish ancestry. 2% of Garrison's residents were of Ukrainian descent and 1% were descended from other Eastern European countries. 8% were German, 7% Polish, 5% Irish, 4% English, 3% Italian, 2% Lithuanian, and 2% French.

There were 3,459 households, out of which 25.7% had children under the age of 18 living with them, 42.0% were married couples living together, 10.8% had a female householder with no husband present, and 43.9% were non-families. 35.5% of all households were made up of individuals, and 6.3% had someone living alone who was 65 years of age or older. The average household size was 2.19 and the average family size was 2.90.

In the CDP, the population was spread out, with 22.0% under the age of 18, 10.3% from 18 to 24, 34.4% from 25 to 44, 23.5% from 45 to 64, and 9.8% who were 65 years of age or older. The median age was 34 years. For every 100 females, there were 98.3 males. For every 100 females age 18 and over, there were 94.9 males.

The median income for a household in the CDP was $56,520, and the median income for a family was $62,171. Males had a median income of $45,286 versus $37,472 for females. The per capita income for the CDP was $36,236. About 4.6% of families and 5.8% of the population were below the poverty line, including 7.4% of those under age 18 and 9.3% of those age 65 or over.

Notable people
 William Cabell Bruce, U.S. senator from Maryland, buried at St. Thomas Episcopal Church Cemetery
 William Maxwell Wood, MD, USN, first Surgeon General of the United States Navy, buried at St. Thomas Episcopal Church Cemetery
 Thomas Cradock, an important colonial poet and local minister (St. Thomas's), buried at St. Thomas Episcopal Church Cemetery (see David Curtis Skaggs, ed., The Poetic Writings of Thomas Cradock, 1718-1770 (Newark: U Delaware Pr, 1983), 94n27).

References

Census-designated places in Baltimore County, Maryland
Census-designated places in Maryland
Russian-Jewish culture in Maryland